Carrie & Tommy is an Australian radio station drive show on the Hit Network.  The show is hosted by Carrie Bickmore, Tommy Little and anchor Jesse Watkins.

History 
In January 2017, Southern Cross Austereo announced that Carrie Bickmore and Tommy Little would host drive across the Hit Network with the show leading into Hamish & Andy. 

Carrie Bickmore had previously been a breakfast news presenter on Hughesy & Kate on Nova 100 and Tommy Little was host of Meshel & Tommy with Meshel Laurie on Nova 100.

In October 2017, Southern Cross Austereo announced the Hit Network's 2018 line up with Carrie & Tommy extending an extra 30 minutes running from 3pm until 4:30pm. Hamish & Andy ended their drive show in December 2017 and were replaced by Hughesy & Kate.

In December 2019, Southern Cross Austereo announced that the show will extend from 3pm until 5pm. Anchor Chris 'Buzz' Bezzina departed the show at the end of 2019 after relocating to Brisbane. He was replaced by Jesse Watkins. 

In November 2020, Southern Cross Austereo confirmed that Carrie and Tommy would return in 2021 to host the Hit Network's national drive show from 3pm to 6pm. Hughesy and Ed previously filled the drive show, in 2021 moving to host the 2Day FM breakfast show The Morning Crew.

In November 2022, it was announced that Carrie and Tommy will continue on the Hit Network for the next four years.

In December 2022, Annabelle McNamara was announced as the next executive producer of the show, replacing Sonder Novak-Booth. Sonder previously taking the newly created role of Network Content Director of National Shows.

Team Members

Current team members

References

External links 
 Carrie & Tommy

Australian radio programs
2010s Australian radio programs
2020s Australian radio programs